Zeghaia (Arabic: زغاية) is a town and commune in Mila Province, Algeria. At the 1998 census it had a population of 38372.

References

Populated places in Mila Province